Courtney Nedwill (14 August 1837 – 10 April 1920) was a New Zealand doctor and public health officer. He was born in Ballyronan, County Londonderry, Ireland. He is said to have been "one of Christchurch's most prominent medical men for half a century".

References

1837 births
1920 deaths
Queen's University at Kingston alumni
New Zealand public health doctors
New Zealand surgeons
Irish emigrants to New Zealand (before 1923)
People from County Londonderry